Krasnovishersky District is an administrative district (raion) of Perm Krai, Russia; one of the thirty-three in the krai. Municipally, it is incorporated as Krasnovishersky Municipal District. It is located in the northeast of the krai, in the valley of the Vishera River, and borders with the Komi Republic in the north, Sverdlovsk Oblast in the east, Cherdynsky District in the west, Solikamsky District in the south, and with the territory of the town of krai significance of Alexandrovsk in the southeast. Its administrative center is the town of Krasnovishersk. Population:  The population of Krasnovishersk accounts for 71.4% of the district's total population.

Geography
The highest point of Perm Krai, Mount Tulymsky Kamen, is located in the district. There are many rivers in the district, including the Vishera River with its tributaries the Yazva, the Vels, the Uls, and many others. Natural resources of the district include diamonds, gold, oil, natural gas, and others.

The climate is temperate continental. Up to 87% of the district's territory is covered by forests. In the extreme northeast of the district the Vishera Nature Reserve is located.

History
The district was established on January 13, 1941. Until then, its territory was a part of Cherdynsky District. Krasnovishersk, the administrative center of the district, was granted town status on July 2, 1942.

Demographics
As of the 2002 Census, about 89.7% of district's population were Russians and 2.5% were the Komi people.

Economy
The industry of the district includes timber industry, pulp and paper mill, mining and food industry.

See also
Visherogorsk
Zagovorukha

References

Notes

Sources

Districts of Perm Krai